Penny Hill is an American songwriter, musician, and singer, from Norman, Oklahoma. She is currently recording her second album. She performs as Penny Hill Party while performing with a full backing band. She has previously performed as a back-up musician for Samantha Crain & Black Canyon and currently plays bass in Low Litas from Tulsa, OK. She has toured with the likes of Peninsula, Blue Valley Farmer, Elephant Revival, Brother Gruesome, and Ghost of Monkshood.

Discography
 Studio Albums
 2010 Unbutton Your Heart
 2011 TBA

 Extended Plays
 2010 (Rough and Unreleased) Homemade Recordings

External links
 (official site)

References

Living people
Musicians from Norman, Oklahoma
American women singer-songwriters
Year of birth missing (living people)
Singer-songwriters from Oklahoma
21st-century American women